The following is a list of national outdoor and indoor athletics records for Canada maintained by Canada's national athletics federation, Athletics Canada.

Outdoor

Key to tables:

+ = En route to a longer distance

A = Affected by altitude

Mx = Mixed race

X = Annulled after doping revelations

NWI = No wind information

Men

Women

Mixed

Indoor

Men

Women

Notes

References
General
Canadian Records – Men Outdoor 10 August 2022 updated
Canadian Records – Women Outdoor 25 June 2022 updated
Canadian Records – Men Indoor 19 March 2022 updated
Canadian Records – Women Indoor 11 March 2023 updated
Canadian Records – Men Road 12 February 2023 updated
Canadian Records – Women Road 16 October 2022 updated
Specific

External links
Athletics Canada website
Canadian Athletics Rankings
Canadian Records

Canadian
Records
Athletics
Athletics